Sparkman-Hillcrest Memorial Park Cemetery is a multi-faith cemetery located at 7405 West Northwest Highway in North Dallas, Texas, United States. It is owned by Service Corporation International. Among the notable persons interred here are:
 Mary Kay Ash (1918–2001), businesswoman
 Harry W. Bass Jr. (1927–1998), businessman
 Orville Bullington (1882–1956), lawyer and Republican politician
 Maureen Connolly (1934–1969), champion tennis player
 Grace Noll Crowell (1877–1969), poet
 Jim Cummins (1945–2007), NBC News reporter
 Roscoe DeWitt (1894–1975), architect
 Bill Forester (1932–2007), NFL linebacker (1953–1963)
 Greer Garson (1904–1996), British-American actress
 Pinky Higgins (1909–1969), Major League Baseball player and manager
 Ted Hinton (1904–1977), deputy sheriff involved in the capture of the bandits Bonnie and Clyde
 William Hootkins (1948–2005), actor
 Tom Hughes (1931–1994), managing producer of Dallas Summer Musicals
 H. L. Hunt (1889–1974), businessman, one of the wealthiest men in the world
 Neel Kearby (1911–1944), World War II Medal of Honor recipient
 Freddie King (1934–1976), blues musician
 Tom Landry (1924–2000), Hall of Fame head coach of Dallas Cowboys; cenotaph at Texas State Cemetery in Austin
 Cyrus Longworth Lundell (1907–1994), scientist
 Merlyn Mantle (1932–2009), author and widow of Mickey Mantle
 Mickey Mantle (1931–1995), Hall of Fame baseball player
 James F. Moriarty (1896–1981), decorated Brigadier general in the Marine Corps
 Clint Murchison Jr. (1923–1987), businessman, founder of Dallas Cowboys
 Wilbert Lee O'Daniel (1890–1969), governor of Texas and U.S. senator
 Jim Parker (1947–2019), lawyer and businessman, former CEO of Southwest Airlines.
 Ross Perot (1930–2019), business magnate, billionaire, philanthropist, and politician.
 B.M. "Mack" Rankin Jr. (1930–2013), businessman, co-founder of Freeport-McMoRan
 Gretchen Celeste Neff Rogers (1934–2020), Senior Vice President at Metropolitan Financial Savings and Loan 
 August Schellenberg (1936–2013), Kanienʼkehá꞉ka actor
 Annette Strauss (1924–1998), mayor of Dallas, Texas
 John Tower (1925–1991), United States Senator from 1961 to 1985; cenotaph at Texas State Cemetery in Austin; the first Mrs. Tower, the former Lou Bullington (1920–2001), is also interred at Sparkman-Hillcrest.
 George Washington Truett (1867–1944), pastor of First Baptist Church of Dallas from 1897 to 1944
 Joseph Franklin Wilson (1901–1968), politician
 Charles Wyly Jr. (1933–2011), entrepreneur, businessman, philanthropist and civic leader

See also
 List of United States cemeteries

References

External links
 
 

Cemeteries in Dallas